Fondi '91 is a 2013 feature film set in Fondi, Italy, directed by Dev Khanna and starring Raymond Ablack. It received mixed reviews from critics upon release.

Plot 
Fondi '91 follows the lustful adventures of Anil and his Jersey-based high school soccer team's two week trip to the town of Fondi, Italy.

Reception 
The National Post called the film "A nice-looking coming-of-age film that doesn't quite get there." NOW Magazine wrote a negative review: "A certain sensitivity and intelligence are required to deal with rape on film. Fondi '91 exhibits little of either, which is why it ends up being shocking, exploitative and profoundly infuriating."

In a mixed review, Toronto Film Scene wrote: "What starts out as a coming of age story from the point of view of four high school boys, each with their own varying levels of testosterone fueled sexual desire, quickly breaks down into a confused story of sexual assault, misguided guilt, and incredibly awkward and unbelievable sexual encounters. It’s a bit of a shame as well, since the first thirty minutes of Fondi ’91 is actually a lot of fun."

References

External links 
 

2013 films
Films set in Italy
2010s coming-of-age drama films
Canadian sports drama films
Canadian coming-of-age drama films
2010s sports drama films
2010s Canadian films